Guillermo Arriaga Jordán (born 13 March 1958) is a Mexican novelist, screenwriter, director and producer. Self-defined as "a hunter who works as a writer," he is best known for his Academy Award for Best Original Screenplay and BAFTA Award for Best Original Screenplay nominations for Babel and his screenplay for The Three Burials of Melquiades Estrada, which received the 2005 Cannes Best Screenplay Award.

Early life

Arriaga was born 13 March 1958 in Mexico City. At the age of 13, he lost the sense of smell after a brutal street fight that would later serve as inspiration for some of his work.

Before engaging in his writing career, Arriaga tried out a variety of jobs and professions, amongst which were that of boxer, basketball player and professional soccer player. He completed a B.A. in Communications and a M.A. in Psychology at the Ibero-American University.

Career

While teaching at the Universidad Iberoamericana, Arriaga met future film director Alejandro González Iñárritu and decided to make a feature length, multiplot film set in Mexico City. The result was Amores Perros (2000). The film received an Oscar nomination for Best Foreign Film as well as a BAFTA Film Award for "Best Film not in the English Language," the "Critics Week Grand Prize" and "Young Critics Award" at the 2000 Cannes Film Festival, as well as many other awards from festivals and societies around the world. 

The success of Amores Perros earned Arriaga and Iñárritu an invitation to the U.S. to work on the Universal/Focus Features film 21 Grams, starring Benicio del Toro, Naomi Watts and Sean Penn. Del Toro and Watts received Academy Award nominations for their performances. 

González Iñárritu and Arriaga collaborated on a third movie, Babel, to form a trilogy with his first two pictures focusing on the theme of death. However, friction between writer and director led to González Iñárritu banning Arriaga from attending the 2006 Cannes screening of Babel. Nevertheless, González Iñárritu and Arriaga both received Academy Award nominations for their work.

On 19 January 2007, the film adaptation of his book El Búfalo de la Noche directed by Jorge Hernandez Aldana premiered at the Sundance film festival. It features a score by Omar Rodríguez-López of The Mars Volta.

On 29 August 2008, The Burning Plain was premiered at the Venice Film Festival. Arriaga wrote the script and pitched it to American producers, who talked with some directors. Arriaga eventually directed the film, starring Charlize Theron.

In 2011, Mexican producers including Arriaga, Alex Garcia, and Lucas Akoskin unveiled "Heartbeat of the World," an international cinema project with four films tackling topics including religion, sexuality, politics and drug addiction. Each of the four feature films consist of a collaborative set of 10 shorts. The first film in the series—Words with Gods—includes contributions from Arriaga, Emir Kusturica, Brazil's Jose Padilha, Australia's Warwick Thornton, Iran's Bahman Ghobadi, India's Mira Nair, and Japan's Hideo Nakata. The three other films are the "drug-themed Into the Bloodstream; Encounters, a look at sexual identity and expression; and Polis, which delves into political topics." Financing for all four movies have been secured, with each produced in 14 months.

Guillermo Arriaga won the Premio Alfaguara de Novela for his novel, Salvar el fuego on January 24, 2020.

Filmography
Arriaga objects to being called a "guionista" (Spanish for "screenwriter"); he advocates for screenwriters being referred to as "writers" and screenplays being referred to as "works of film." He has clarified that he has no objections to the term's use in English; his issue with "guionista" is that in Spanish the term has the wrong connotations since the word also used to describe people who write tour guidebooks.

Feature films

Short films

Selected works

Trivia

Since 2005, Guillermo Arriaga has been one of the patrons of DreamAgo, an international screenwriters association.

References

External links

 Interview with Guillermo Arriaga at El Malpensante
Writing (and Filming) the Memories: Interview with Guillermo Arriaga on The Burning Plain by Matthew Sorrento (Bright Lights Film Journal)

1958 births
Universidad Iberoamericana alumni
Academic staff of Universidad Iberoamericana
Living people
Mexican male screenwriters
Writers from Mexico City
Mexican film directors
Cannes Film Festival Award for Best Screenplay winners